Aleksandr Vladimirovich Ivchenko (born 6 January 1952) is a Russian professional football coach.

Honours
 Russian Second Division, Zone East best manager: 2009.

References

External links
  Career summary at Footballfacts

1952 births
Living people
Soviet football managers
Russian football managers
FC Rubin Kazan managers
FC Luch Vladivostok managers
Russian Premier League managers
Russian expatriate football managers
Expatriate football managers in Oman
FC Lada-Tolyatti managers
FC Tyumen managers